Paatelainen may refer to:

Markus Paatelainen (born 1983), retired Finnish football midfielder
Matti Paatelainen (born 1944), Finnish former international footballer
Mikko Paatelainen (born 1980), Finnish former professional footballer
Mixu Paatelainen (born 1967), Finnish former professional football player